Sangeethe is a 2019 Sri Lankan television prime-time soap opera which premiered on 11 February 2019 on TV Derana. The series is directed by Saranga Mendis, produced by Chamika Mendis and written by Saman Edirimunee. It airs every weekday from 8:00 pm to 8:30 pm onwards. Lavan Abhishek, Geethma Bandara, Pramoth Ganearachchi and Sriyantha Mendis are performing the leading roles.

Plot
Mahee belongs to a middle-class family and is a bandleader of his musical band which he forms with his friends, and Aseni is a golden-hearted rich daughter of an evil-hearted businessman who thinks everything is money. Despite being able to have good life Aseni always wanted to be simple, so she often walks or takes public buses to school. With her bubbly personality as a final year high schooler Aseni managed to be friends with Mahee's younger brother, and soon they turned into best friends who would always end up teasing each other. Aseni was also loved by Mahee's elder sister who taught in the same school, however Mahee hates Aseni and thinks Aseni to be evil as her brothers. Aseni being the bubbly as she is often tried her best to be friend with Mahee, who always pass by her school in his motorcycle. Mahee soon realises that Aseni is a kind hearted girl and is extremely righteous unlike her evil brothers and parents.

Once as he was passing by the road he helps Aseni's grandfather who was sick, and Aseni thanked Mahee for saving his grandfather, who is the only person who truly cares about her. It is said Aseni's parents dropped Aseni's grandfather over the elderly home when she was young, and from that day Aseni frequently used to visit her grandfather who was in elderly home. With days passing by soon Mahee befriends with Aseni, and soon they shared loving friendship and develop a crush toward each other secretly but both was scared to confess as their families were rivals. Soon Aseni starts visiting Mahee's home frequently and formed a good bond with Mahee's father, elder sister, and younger sister. It does not take much longer for Aseni's family to realise the friendship of Aseni, Malitha (Mahee's younger brother) and Mahee. Despite of being threatened and beaten up, Mahee and Aseni's bond became grew intimate, and soon both end up confessing to each other after falling in love with each other. However Mahee's family who loved Aseni as if she was of their own family, accepted her as Mahee's girlfriend. 

But Aseni's family who was rude enough ends up insulting Mahee's family and threatening them in various ways. Aseeni and Mahee's love story faced every kind problems, that are even unusual. Soon Aseni's father fixed Aseni's engagement with Kalpana who was a son of corrupted politician and he himself was also a playboy and corrupted politician. Kalpana proposed to Aseni and she rejected him as she is in love with Mahee, but an enraged Kalpana tried to kill Mahee but ends up failing. Aseni's family forced her relationship with Kalpana, Aseni began to hate Kalpana due to his cheap work, Kalpana too hates her but keeps acting as if he loves her, in order to take revenge from her for rejecting and ignoring him, however each time Aseni managed to postponed her engagement with Kalpana, and often went on dates and hangout with her only love Mahee.

Cast and characters

Main cast 
 Lavan Abhishek as Mahee
 Geethma Bandara as Aseni
 Pramoth Ganearachchi as Kalana
 Sriyantha Mendis as Asela Morawaka

Supporting cast 

 Manoj Devage as Kalpana
 Kumudu Nishantha as Milinda 
 Prabath Chathuranga as Ranjan
 Dayadewa Edirisinghe as Senaka
 Douglas Ranasinghe as Sarath Morawaka 
 Hashini Wedanda as Senuri 
 Indika Subasinghe as Semini
 Menuka Premarathna as Minister Suranjith
 Rukshanthi Perera as Mali
 Asanjaya Weerasinghe as Lamba (Kasun Lambert)
 Naveen Dilshan as Thisanka
 Hansini Wimalasiri as Nishani
 Sachini Ranawaka as Amaya
 Anura Priyakelum as Pola
 Shanaka Udeesha as Rocky
 Nilupul Bandara as Dasun
 Sithum Nimantha as Sunil
 Tharindu Pradeep as Nayana
 Kelum Devanarayana as Malitha

See also
Deweni Inima

References

External links 

 

Sri Lankan television shows
2010s television soap operas
TV Derana original programming